El Salvador first competed in the Olympic Games at the 1968 Summer Olympics in Mexico City, Mexico. No athletes were sent to the 1976 Summer Olympics, and the nation took part in the boycott of the 1980 Summer Olympics. Excluding these two Games, El Salvador has participated in every Summer Olympic Games since 1968. It has never competed in the Olympic Winter Games. As of the completion of the 2012 Summer Olympics, 118 Salvadorans (93 male and 25 female) have represented their nation at the Olympics. No Salvadoran has ever won an Olympic medal.

Both the all-time youngest and oldest Olympic participants from El Salvador competed at the 1968 Games. Swimmer Rubén Guerrero (13 years, 351 days) swam in five events: the Men's 400 meters freestyle, 1,500 meters freestyle, 4 × 100 meters freestyle relay, 100 meters butterfly, and 200 meters individual medley. Roberto Soundy (68 years, 229 days) finished 54th in the trap shooting event.

Fourteen athletes have competed in multiple Olympics. Eva Dimas, Evelyn García, and Juan Vargas, are the only Salvadorans to have competed in three Olympic Games. Andrés Amador, Kriscia García, Maureen Kaila Vergara, Luisa Maida, Gustavo Manzur, Golda Marcus, Francisco Suriano, Fredy Torres, Juan Antonio Valencia, Camila Vargas, and Salvador Vilanova have each competed in two Olympic Games.

Athletes

See also
El Salvador at the Olympics

References

External links
Sports-Reference: El Salvador at the Olympic Games

 
Olympics
Salvador
Olympic